Oeneis uhleri, or Uhler's Arctic, is a species of butterfly in the family Nymphalidae.

The larvae feed on various grasses and sedges, including Festuca, Koeleria and Poa species. Fourth-instar larvae overwinter and emerge in spring.

Subspecies
Oeneis uhleri uhleri (Colorado: eastern slope)
Oeneis uhleri cairnesi Gibson, 1920 (Yukon, north-western Northwest Territories, north-eastern Alaska)
Oeneis uhleri nahanni Dyar, 1904 (Northwest Territories: Mackenzie Mountains)
Oeneis uhleri reinthali Brown, 1953 (Colorado: western slope)
Oeneis uhleri varuna (Edwards, 1882) (British Columbia, Alberta, Saskatchewan, Manitoba, Montana, North Dakota, South Dakota, Nebraska, western Minnesota)

References

Butterflies described in 1866
Oeneis
Butterflies of North America
Taxa named by Tryon Reakirt